Heartburn, also known as pyrosis, cardialgia or acid indigestion, is a burning sensation in the central chest or upper central abdomen. Heartburn is usually due to regurgitation of gastric acid (gastric reflux) into the esophagus. It is the major symptom of gastroesophageal reflux disease (GERD).

Other common descriptors for heartburn (besides burning) are belching, nausea, squeezing, stabbing, or a sensation of pressure on the chest. The pain often rises in the chest (directly behind the breastbone) and may radiate to the neck, throat, or angle of the arm. Because the chest houses other important organs besides the esophagus (including the heart and lungs), not all symptoms related to heartburn are esophageal in nature.

The cause will vary depending on one's family and medical history, genetics, if a person is pregnant or lactating, and age. As a result, the diagnosis will vary depending on the suspected organ and the inciting disease process. Work-up will vary depending on the clinical suspicion of the provider seeing the patient, but generally includes endoscopy and a trial of antacids to assess for relief.

Treatment for heartburn may include medications and dietary changes. Medication include antacids. Dietary changes may require avoiding foods that are high in fats, spicy, high in artificial flavors, heavily reducing NSAID use, heavy alcohol consumption, and decreasing peppermint consumption. Lifestyle changes may help such as reducing weight.

Definition
The term indigestion includes heartburn along with a number of other symptoms. Indigestion is sometimes defined as a combination of epigastric pain and heartburn. Heartburn is commonly used interchangeably with gastroesophageal reflux disease (GERD) rather than just to describe a symptom of burning in one's chest.

Differential diagnosis
Heartburn-like symptoms and/or lower chest or upper abdomen may be indicative of much more sinister and/or deadly disease. Of greatest concern is to confuse heartburn (generally related to the esophagus) with a heart attack as these organs share a common nerve supply. Numerous abdominal and thoracic organs are present in that region of the body. Many different organ systems might explain the discomfort called heartburn.

Heart
The most common symptom for a heart attack is chest pain. However, as many as 30% of chest pain patients undergoing cardiac catheterization have findings that do not account for their chest discomfort. These are often defined as having "atypical chest pain" or chest pain of undetermined origin. Women experiencing heart attacks may also deny classic signs and symptoms and instead complain of GI symptoms. One article estimates that ischemic heart disease may appear to be GERD in 0.6% of people.

Esophagus
 GERD (most common cause of heartburn) occurs when acid refluxes from the stomach and inflames the esophagus.
 Esophageal spasms typically occur after eating or drinking and may be combined with difficulty swallowing.
 Esophageal strictures
 Esophageal cancers

Esophagitis 
 GERD
 Eosinophilic esophagitis – a disease commonly associated with other atopic diseases such as asthma, food allergies, seasonal allergies, and atopic skin disease 
 Mallory-Weis tears – tears of the superficial mucosa of the esophagus that are subsequently exposed to gastric acid commonly due to vomiting and/or retching
 Chemical esophagitis – related to the intake of caustic substances, excessive amounts of hot liquids, alcohol, or tobacco smoke
 Infections may explain heartburn symptoms. These especially include CMV and certain fungal infections, most common in immunocompromised persons

Stomach 
 Peptic ulcer disease – can be secondary to H. Pylori infection or heavy NSAID use that weakens stomach mucosal layer. Pain often worsens with eating.
 Stomach cancer

Intestines 
 Intestinal ulcers – generally secondary to other conditions such as H. Pylori infection or cancers of the GI tract. Pain often improves with eating.
 Duodenitis – inflammation of the small intestine. May be the result of several conditions

Gallbladder 
 Gallstones

Pancreas 
 Pancreatitis – can be autoimmune, due to a gallstone obstructing the lumen, related to alcohol consumption.

Hematology 

 Pernicious anemia – can be autoimmune, due to atrophic gastritis.

Pregnancy 
Heartburn is common during pregnancy having been reported in as high as 80% of pregnancies. It is most often due to GERD and results from relaxation of the lower esophageal sphincter (LES), changes in gastric motility, and/or increasing intra-abdominal pressure. The onset of symptoms can be during any trimester of pregnancy.
 Hormonal – related to the increasing amounts of estrogen and progesterone and their effect on the LES
 Mechanical – the enlarging uterus increasing intra-abdominal pressure, inducing reflux of gastric acid  
 Behavioral – as with other instances of heartburn, behavioral modifications can exacerbate or alleviate symptoms

Unknown origin 
Functional heartburn is heartburn of unknown cause. It is commonly associated with psychiatric conditions like depression, anxiety, and panic attacks. It is also seen with other functional gastrointestinal disorders like irritable bowel syndrome and is the primary cause of lack of improvement post treatment with proton pump inhibitors (PPIs). Despite this, PPIs are still the primary treatment with response rates in about 50% of people. The diagnosis is one of elimination, based upon the Rome III criteria. It was found to be present in 22.3% of Canadians in one survey.

Diagnostic approach 
Heartburn can be caused by several conditions and a preliminary diagnosis of GERD is based on additional signs and symptoms. The chest pain caused by GERD has a distinct 'burning' sensation, occurs after eating or at night, and worsens when a person lies down or bends over. It also is common in pregnant women, and may be triggered by consuming food in large quantities, or specific foods containing certain spices, high fat content, or high acid content. In young persons (typically <40 years) who present with heartburn symptoms consistent with GERD (onset after eating, when laying down, when pregnant), a physician may begin a course of PPIs to assess clinical improvement before additional testing is undergone. Resolution or improvement of symptoms on this course may result in a diagnosis of GERD.

Other tests or symptoms suggesting acid reflux is causing heartburn include:
 Onset of symptoms after eating or drinking, at night, and/or with pregnancy, and improvement with PPIs
 Endoscopy looking for erosive changes of the esophagus consistent with prolonged acid exposure (e.g. - Barrett's esophagus)
 Upper GI series looking for the presence of acid reflux

GI cocktail

Relief of symptoms 5 to 10 minutes after the administration of viscous lidocaine and an antacid increases the suspicion that the pain is esophageal in origin. This however does not rule out a potential cardiac cause as 10% of cases of discomfort due to cardiac causes are improved with antacids.

Biochemical
Esophageal pH monitoring: a probe can be placed via the nose into the esophagus to record the level of acidity in the lower esophagus. Because some degree of variation in acidity is normal, and small reflux events are relatively common, esophageal pH monitoring can be used to document reflux in real-time. Patients are able to record symptom onset to correlate lower esophageal pH with time of symptom onset.

Mechanical
Manometry: in this test, a pressure sensor (manometer) is passed via the mouth into the esophagus and measures the pressure of the LES directly.

Endoscopy: the esophageal mucosa can be visualized directly by passing a thin, lighted tube with a tiny camera known as an endoscope attached through the mouth to examine the oesophagus and stomach. In this way, evidence of esophageal inflammation can be detected, and biopsies taken if necessary. Since an endoscopy allows a doctor to visually inspect the upper digestive tract the procedure may help identify any additional damage to the tract that may not have been detected otherwise.

Biopsy: a small sample of tissue from the oesophagus is removed. It is then studied to check for inflammation, cancer, or other problems.

Treatment
Treatment plans are tailored to the specific diagnosis and etiology of the heartburn. Management of heartburn can be sorted into various categories.

Pharmacologic management 
 Antacids (i.e. calcium carbonate) are often taken to treat the immediate problem
 H2 receptor antagonists or proton pump inhibitors are effective for the two most common causes of heartburn (e.g. gastritis and GERD)
 Antibiotics are used if H. pylori is present.

Behavioral management 
 Taking medications 30–45 minutes before eating suppresses the stomach's acid generating response to food
 Avoiding spicy foods, foods high in fats, peppermint, and chocolate 
 Avoiding reclining 2.5–3.5 hours after a meal to prevent the reflux of stomach's contents

Lifestyle modifications 
 Early studies show that diets that are high in fiber may show evidence in decreasing symptoms of dyspepsia.
 Weight loss can decrease abdominal pressure that both delays gastric emptying and increases gastric acid reflux into the esophagus

Alternative and complementary therapies 
Symptoms of heartburn may not always be the result of an organic cause. Patients may respond better to therapies targeting anxiety and symptoms of hyper-vigilance, through medications aimed towards a psychiatric etiology, osteopathic manipulation and acupuncture.
 Psychotherapy may show a positive role in treatment of heartburn and the reduction of distress experienced during symptoms.
 Acupuncture - in cases of functional heartburn (e.g. heartburn of unknown origin) acupuncture may be as effective if not more than PPIs alone.

Surgical management 

In the case of GERD causing heartburn symptoms, surgery may be required if PPI is not effective. Surgery is not undergone if functional heartburn is the leading diagnosis.

Epidemiology
About 42% of the United States population has had heartburn at some point.

References

Symptoms and signs: Digestive system and abdomen